Belisana is a genus of cellar spiders that was first described by Tamerlan Thorell in 1898.

Species
 it contains 143 species, found in Asia, Papua New Guinea, on Fiji, in Australia, and Kiribati:

B. airai Huber, 2005 – Caroline Is.
B. akebona (Komatsu, 1961) – Japan
B. aliformis Tong & Li, 2008 – China
B. amabilis (Paik, 1978) – Korea
B. ambengan Huber, 2005 – Bali
B. anhuiensis (Xu & Wang, 1984) – China
B. aninaj Huber, 2005 – Thailand
B. apo Huber, 2005 – Philippines
B. australis Huber, 2001 – Indonesia (Moluccas), Australia (Northern Territory, Queensland)
B. babensis Yao, Pham & Li, 2015 – Vietnam
B. bachma Zhu & Li, 2021 – Vietnam
B. badulla Huber, 2019 – Sri Lanka
B. banlakwo Huber, 2005 – Thailand
B. bantham Huber, 2005 – Thailand
B. bawangensis Zhang & Peng, 2011 – China
B. benjamini Huber, 2005 – Sri Lanka
B. bohorok Huber, 2005 – Malaysia, Indonesia (Sumatra, Borneo)
B. bubeng Zhu & Li, 2021 – China
B. cas Yao & Li, 2018 – China
B. champasakensis Yao & Li, 2013 – Laos
B. chaoanensis Zhang & Peng, 2011 – China
B. cheni Yao, Pham & Li, 2015 – Vietnam
B. chenjini Yao & Li, 2018 – China
B. clavata Yao, Pham & Li, 2015 – Vietnam
B. colubrina Zhang & Peng, 2011 – China
B. crystallina Yao & Li, 2013 – Laos
B. cucphuong Zhu & Li, 2021 – Vietnam
B. curva Yao, Pham & Li, 2015 – Vietnam
B. daji Chen, Zhang & Zhu, 2009 – China
B. davao Huber, 2005 – Philippines, Indonesia (Borneo)
B. decora Yao, Pham & Li, 2015 – Vietnam
B. denticulata Pham, 2015 – Vietnam
B. desciscens Tong & Li, 2009 – China
B. dian Yao & Li, 2018 – China
B. diaoluoensis Zhang & Peng, 2011 – China
B. dodabetta Huber, 2005 – India
B. doloduo Huber, 2005 – Indonesia (Sulawesi)
B. douqing Chen, Zhang & Zhu, 2009 – China
B. erawan Huber, 2005 – Thailand
B. erromena Zhang & Peng, 2011 – China
B. exian Tong & Li, 2009 – China
B. fiji Huber, 2005 – Fiji
B. floreni Huber, 2005 – Borneo
B. flores Huber, 2005 – Indonesia
B. forcipata (Tu, 1994) – China
B. fraser Huber, 2005 – Malaysia
B. freyae Huber, 2005 – Indonesia (Sumatra)
B. galeiformis Zhang & Peng, 2011 – China
B. gedeh Huber, 2005 – Indonesia (Java)
B. gigantea Yao & Li, 2013 – Laos
B. gowindahela Huber, 2019 – Sri Lanka
B. guilin Yao & Li, 2020 – China
B. gupian Yao & Li, 2018 – China
B. gyirong Zhang, Zhu & Song, 2006 – China
B. halongensis Yao, Pham & Li, 2015 – Vietnam
B. hormigai Huber, 2005 – Thailand
B. huberi Tong & Li, 2008 – China
B. inthanon Huber, 2005 – Thailand
B. jaegeri Zhu & Li, 2021 – Malaysia (peninsula)
B. jimi Huber, 2005 – New Guinea
B. junkoae (Irie, 1997) – Taiwan, Japan
B. kachin Zhu & Li, 2021 – Myanmar
B. kaharian Huber, 2005 – Borneo
B. kendari Huber, 2005 – Indonesia (Sulawesi)
B. ketambe Huber, 2005 – Thailand, Indonesia (Sumatra)
B. keyti Huber, 2005 – Sri Lanka
B. khanensis Yao & Li, 2013 – Laos
B. khaosok Huber, 2005 – Thailand
B. khaoyai Huber, 2005 – Thailand
B. khieo Huber, 2005 – Thailand
B. kinabalu Huber, 2005 – Borneo
B. lamellaris Tong & Li, 2008 – China
B. lancea Yao & Li, 2013 – Laos
B. lata Zhang & Peng, 2011 – China
B. leclerci Huber, 2005 – Thailand
B. leumas Huber, 2005 – Thailand
B. leuser Huber, 2005 – Thailand, Malaysia, Indonesia (Sumatra, Borneo)
B. lii Chen, Yu & Guo, 2016 – China
B. limpida (Simon, 1909) – Vietnam
B. longinqua Zhang & Peng, 2011 – China
B. mainling Zhang, Zhu & Song, 2006 – China
B. maoer Yao & Li, 2020 – China
B. maogan Tong & Li, 2009 – China
B. marena Huber, 2005 – Indonesia (Sulawesi)
B. martensi Yao & Li, 2013 – Laos
B. marusiki Huber, 2005 – India
B. medog Yao & Li, 2020 – China
B. menghai Yao & Li, 2019 – China
B. mengla Yao & Li, 2020 – China
B. menglun Yao & Li, 2020 – China
B. mengyang Yao & Li, 2020 – China
B. minneriya Huber, 2019 – Sri Lanka
B. muruo Yao & Li, 2020 – China
B. nahtanoj Huber, 2005 – Indonesia (Sulawesi)
B. naling Yao & Li, 2020 – China
B. nomis Huber, 2005 – Malaysia, Singapore
B. nujiang Huber, 2005 – China
B. parallelica Zhang & Peng, 2011 – China
B. phungae Yao, Pham & Li, 2015 – Vietnam
B. phurua Huber, 2005 – Thailand
B. pianma Huber, 2005 – China
B. pisinna Yao, Pham & Li, 2015 – Vietnam
B. pranburi Huber, 2005 – Thailand
B. protumida Yao, Li & Jäger, 2014 – Malaysia
B. putao Yao & Li, 2020 – Myanmar
B. ranong Huber, 2005 – Thailand
B. ratnapura Huber, 2005 – Sri Lanka
B. rollofoliolata (Wang, 1983) – China
B. sabah Huber, 2005 – Borneo
B. sandakan Huber, 2005 – Malaysia, Indonesia (Sumatra, Borneo)
B. sarika Huber, 2005 – Thailand
B. scharffi Huber, 2005 – Thailand
B. schwendingeri Huber, 2005 – China, Thailand, Vietnam
B. sepaku Huber, 2005 – Vietnam, Indonesia (Borneo)
B. strinatii Huber, 2005 – Malaysia
B. sumba Huber, 2005 – Indonesia
B. tadetuensis Yao & Li, 2013 – Laos
B. tambligan Huber, 2005 – Indonesia (Java, Bali)
B. tarang Zhu & Li, 2021 – Indonesia (Sumatra)
B. tauricornis Thorell, 1898 (type) – Myanmar
B. tianlinensis Zhang & Peng, 2011 – China
B. tongle Zhang, Chen & Zhu, 2008 – China
B. triangula Yao, Pham & Li, 2015 – Vietnam
B. vietnamensis Yao, Pham & Li, 2015 – Vietnam
B. wau Huber, 2005 – New Guinea
B. xiangensis Yao & Li, 2013 – Laos
B. xiaolongha Zhu & Li, 2021 – China
B. xigaze Zhu & Li, 2021 – China
B. xishuangbanna Yao & Li, 2019 – China
B. xishui Chen, Zhang & Zhu, 2009 – China
B. xiyuan Yao & Li, 2020 – China
B. xuanguan Yao & Li, 2020 – China
B. yadongensis (Hu, 1985) – China
B. yalong Tong & Li, 2009 – China
B. yanbaruensis (Irie, 2002) – Japan
B. yangi Zhang & Peng, 2011 – China
B. yangxiaodongi Yao & Li, 2018 – China
B. yanhe Chen, Zhang & Zhu, 2009 – China
B. yap Huber, 2005 – Caroline Is.
B. yuexiu Yao & Li, 2020 – China
B. zham Yao & Li, 2020 – China
B. zhangi Tong & Li, 2007 – China
B. zhengi Yao, Pham & Li, 2015 – China, Vietnam

See also
 List of Pholcidae species

References

Araneomorphae genera
Pholcidae
Spiders of Asia
Taxa named by Tamerlan Thorell